Denise Camillia Tan (born 6 November 1992), is a Malaysian actress, who is based in Singapore.

Career
Tan participated in Miss Astro, a beauty pageant in Malaysia in 2012 which she won, and crowned Miss Astro Chinese 2012 at the age of 19. She participated in the Miss Chinese International Pageant in 2013 and was the runner-up for it.

Tan made her acting debut in 2016, in the Malaysian-Hong Kong production, The Hiddens, starring as Rachel in the drama.

In 2017, Tan was introduced to Singaporean viewers with Legal Eagles and she signed as a full-time artist with Mediacorp and continued filmed Have A Little Faith and her first villain role in While We Are Young. From May 2017 to February 2020, she was also the co-host on the outdoor cooking segment in the long-time game show The Sheng Siong Show, replacing Seraph Sun; she has since been replaced by Seow Sin Nee.

In 2018, she had filmed Mind Matters, Fifty & Fabulous, Say Cheese and Heart To Heart.

Filmography

TV series

Variety Show

Accolades

References

1992 births
Living people
Singaporean television actresses